Banff station is a railway station in Banff, Alberta, Canada. It is used by the Royal Canadian Pacific rail tour services and previously by Rocky Mountaineer. The station is located on Canadian Pacific line.

The station was originally built for the Canadian Pacific Railway. The station was declared a heritage railway station by the federal government in 1991.

See also

 List of designated heritage railway stations of Canada

References

Designated Heritage Railway Stations in Alberta
Canadian Pacific Railway stations in Alberta
Rocky Mountaineer stations in Alberta
Buildings and structures in Banff, Alberta